The BC Refederation Party (abbreviated BC Refed) was a provincial political party in British Columbia, Canada advocating for a direct democracy and reforms to Canadian federalism. It was formed shortly after the 2000 federal election as the Western Independence Party of British Columbia with an explicit western separatist platform; it later renamed itself the Western Refederation Party of British Columbia before adopting its final name.

After the name change, the party slightly changed its focus; it hoped to force changes to the way that British Columbia is governed within Canada. BC Refederation believed in the collective wisdom of the people of BC and believed that nothing initiated by the citizens should be restricted including being allowed a provincial referendum on political independence from Canada for British Columbia if desired by the public.

The BC Refederation Party argued that there are three constitutional flaws in Canada. The first, that there exists no confederation document approved democratically. The second, that there exists no democratically achieved constitutional documents federally or provincially and the third, that there is no constitutional basis for the federal government's rights to collect income tax.

2005 election
As the Western Refederation Party of British Columbia, RefedBC nominated four candidates in the 2005 provincial election, who won a total of 653 votes (0.039% of the popular vote across the province):
Bruce Ryder won 275 votes (0.90% of the total) in Nanaimo-Parksville,
Linden Robert Shaw won 168 votes (0.69%) in Nanaimo
Allen McIntyre won 149	votes (0.62%) in Powell River-Sunshine Coast, and
Mel Garden won 61 votes (0.21%) in Comox Valley.

2009 election
In the 2009 provincial election the party ran a total of 22 candidates who managed to achieve 3,748 total votes.

2017 election and deregistration

It nominated three candidates in the 2017 provincial election, none of whom were elected.

It did not nominate any candidates in the 2020 provincial election and is no longer registered as a political party.

Leaders
 John Twigg, 2007
 Mike Summers, 2008–2010
 Ingrid Voigt, 2010–2011

Party program
The goals of the BC Refederation Party were contained in a three-step plan.
Enact direct democracy to immediately empower the citizens of BC to control politicians and the political process.
Create a citizen designed and ratified written constitution that will entrench the rights of citizens and clearly define the rights of citizens over government.
Regain areas of former provincial control from the federal government. This combined with the application of direct democracy principles will amount to a re-federation. This does not mean separation.

See also
 List of British Columbia political parties

References

External links
 Official Site

Political parties established in 2000
Refederation
Defunct political parties in Canada
2000 establishments in British Columbia
Surrey, British Columbia